Los Cantos del Corazón is a 1995 album by Graciela Naranjo and Estelita Del Llano.



Track listing
 Presentación (D.D.)                                   		0:21
 Carrousel del Pasado (Ignacio Izcaray)                            3:51
 Intermedio (D.D.)                               			0:33
 Uno (Marianito Mores / Enrique Santos Discépolo)                4:31
 Conprendeme (María Alma)                        			4:31
 Tú No Sospechas (Martha Valdés) 				        2:58
 Verano ( J. M. Mora / F. Gorrindo)    							2:58
 Franqueza (Consuelo Velázquez)    			        3:36
 En la Soledad (Jesús Sanoja Rivero)                             	3:00
 Mi Deuda de Amor (Adolfo Reyes / Armando Beltrán)                   3:15
 Humo en los Ojos (Agustín Lara)                               3:55
 Cita a las 6:00 / Ya son las 12:00 (Adolfo Salas / Juan Bruno Tarraza)3:26
 Paraiso Soñado (Manuel Sánchez Acosta)            		3:11
 El Último Café (Stamponi / Castillo)              			3:15
 Ay Cariño (Federico Baena)              				2:55
 Ya me se tu Piel (Ignacio Izcaray)        			3:09
 Intermedio (D.D.)              					0:30
 Puro Teatro (Catalino Curet Alonso)    				2:48
 Quisiera (Luis Alfonzo Larrain)              			2:10
 Blancas Azucenas (Pedro Flores)              			2:59
 Tú Sabes (Taborda / J. Quiroz / E. Alvarez)              		3:51
 Potpurri (Como yo Quiero / Me Queda el Consuelo / Una Mujer Como Usted (Aldemaro Romero) 4:33
 Humanidad / Fin (Alberto Domínguez / D.D.)    				3:10

Personnel
 Graciela Naranjo (vocals)
 Estelita Del Llano (vocals), maracas)
 Alberto Naranjo (arranger, director, timbales)
 Gustavo Carucí (bass, guitar, cuatro)
 Víctor Mestas (piano)
 Alexander Livinalli (percussion)

Guest stars
 Julio Flores (clarinet) on (2), (tenor sax) on (15)
 Julio Mendoza (trumpet) on (10)
 Rodolfo Reyes (flute) on (20)
 Domingo Sánchez Bór (cello) on (13)
 Salvador Soteldo (harmonica) on (4,8)

Special participation
 Orquesta Anacaona on (11)
 Carlos Gardel and Mona Maris on (3)
 Gilberto Pinto on (17)
 Aldemaro Romero piano and vocals on (22)

Production
 Date of Recording: May - June 1995.
 Place of Recording: Caracas, Venezuela
 Label: Roberto Obeso & Federico Pacanins

References 

Albums by Venezuelan artists
1995 albums